Boira Mteki (1946-September, 1991) was a Zimbabwean sculptor.

A native of Harare, Mteki was among the founder members of Frank McEwen's Workshop School, and was among the first of its sculptors to use the harder native stones, such as serpentinite, granite, limestone, and springstone, which were then available.  His works are currently in the collections of the National Gallery of Zimbabwe and the Chapungu Sculpture Park.

References

Biographical sketch

1946 births
1991 deaths
People from Harare
20th-century Zimbabwean sculptors